Thyroscyphidae is a family of cnidarians belonging to the order Leptothecata.

Genera:
 Parascyphus Ritchie, 1911
 Sertularelloides Leloup, 1937
 Symmetroscyphus Calder, 1986
 Thyroscyphoides Naumov, 1955
 Thyroscyphus Allman, 1877
 Tuberocaulus Galea, 2019
 Uniscyphus Millard, 1977

References

Sertularioidea
Cnidarian families